Burnap is a surname. Notable people with the surname include:

Andrew Burnap (born 1991), American actor
Campbell Burnap (1939–2008), British jazz trombonist, vocalist, and broadcaster
Daniel Burnap (1759–1838), American clockmaker
George Washington Burnap (1802–1859), Unitarian clergyman of the United States